Hajnáčka is a village and municipality in the Rimavská Sobota District of the Banská Bystrica Region of southern Slovakia.

History
In historical records the village was first mentioned in 1245 as Danuskue (1255 Kues, 1344 Anyaskw; the name comes from Slavic "Hajnáč") when a big castle was standing here. The village developed from the farmyard under the castle. It was always the seat of important feudal lords. In 1545 it was besieged by Turks. During the Turkish times the village was abandoned. In 1773 there were only 13 peasant farmers and some craftsmen living in the village. In 1828 there were 84 houses and 375 inhabitants. These people mainly lived from agriculture till 1945. From 1938 till 1944 Hajnáčka was part of Hungary.

Culture
Historical monuments in Hajnáčka include:
 Hajnáčka Castle ruins
 An 18th century chapel

Genealogical resources

The records for genealogical research are available at the state archive "Statny Archiv in Banska Bystrica, Slovakia"

 Roman Catholic church records (births/marriages/deaths): 1787-1898 (parish B)

See also
 List of municipalities and towns in Slovakia

References

External links
http://www.e-obce.sk/obec/hajnacka/hajnacka.html
http://www.zamky.sk/hrady-a-zamky/hajnacka-hrad
http://www.pamiatky.net/?q=node/3&mon=609955
Surnames of living people in Hajnacka

Villages and municipalities in Rimavská Sobota District